Ectatina irrorata is a species of beetle in the family Cerambycidae, and the only species in the genus Ectatina. It was described by Gahan in 1907.

References

Desmiphorini
Beetles described in 1907
Monotypic Cerambycidae genera